Jochum ten Haaf (17 December 1978) is a Dutch actor, notable for stage, film and television work including Charles II: The Power and The Passion (2003), Bad Girls (2003), Nightwatching (2007), Summer Heat (2008), Castle Amerongen (2011) and The Resistance Banker (2018).

Career
ten Haaf was born in Maastricht. He gained prominence as Vincent van Gogh in the 2002 premiere of the play Vincent in Brixton, gaining him a nomination for the Evening Standard Theatre Award for best newcomer and a Theatre World Award for the play's US run. He also argued van Gogh's case in the 2004 poll De Grootste Nederlander. From 2014 to 2015 he appeared in the London production of War Horse.

Filmography

References

Living people
Dutch male actors
1978 births
Actors from Maastricht
Theatre World Award winners